The What A Summer Stakes is an American Thoroughbred horse race held annually in January at Laurel Park Racecourse in Laurel, Maryland. The race is open to fillies and mares four years old and up and is run at six furlongs on the dirt.

An ungraded stakes race, it offers a purse of $100,000. The race was restricted to Maryland-breds between 1978 and 1992. It was run for fillies and mares from age three and up from 1978 through 1985 and was run under handicap conditions during that same time. The race was restricted to two-year-olds from 1985 to 1992.

The race was named in honor of What A Summer, a gray mare by What Luck. She was an Eclipse Award winner and was named American Champion Sprint Horse in 1977. She was bred in Maryland by Milton Polinger. What A Summer was a foal in 1973 and won 18 of 31 starts in her career. She won the de facto second leg of the filly Triple Crown, the Black-Eyed Susan Stakes,  won the Fall Highweight Handicap twice (carrying 134 pounds each time), the Silver Spoon Handicap twice, the Maskette Handicap and four other stakes. In addition to her 18 wins, she  placed nine times with earnings of $479,161. That record of 27 first or second finishes in 31 starts at 87% is among the best in history.

What A Summer was trained by Bud Delp while racing for Polinger. She was bought by Diana Firestone following Polinger's death in 1976. Mrs. Firestone turned the mare over to trainer LeRoy Jolley. She was named Maryland-bred horse of the year in 1977 and twice was named champion older mare. What A Summer was retired in 1878 and as a broodmare produced several graded stakes winners.

A venue of 1994 race was Gulfstream Park.

Records 

Speed record: 
 6 furlongs – 1:09.20 – Xtra Heat   (2003) 
 7 furlongs – 1:23.60 – Sea Siren   (1983)

Most wins by an horse:
 2 – Silmaril    (2006 & 2007)
 2 – Sweet on Smokey    (2016 & 2017)

Most wins by an owner:
 3 – Stephen E. Quick   (1982, 2007 & 2008)

Most wins by a jockey:
 2 – five different jockeys share this record with 2 wins each

Most wins by a trainer:
 3 – Christopher W. Grove    (2007, 2008 & 2010)

Winners of the What A Summer Stakes since 1978

See also 

 What A Summer Stakes top three finishers

References

External links
 Laurel Park website

1978 establishments in Maryland
Laurel Park Racecourse
Horse races in Maryland
Recurring sporting events established in 1978